Michael Morris Baylson (born May 29, 1939) is a senior United States district judge of the U.S. District Court for the Eastern District of Pennsylvania.

Education and career

Born in Philadelphia, Pennsylvania, Baylson attended Cheltenham High School in neighboring Cheltenham Township and graduated in 1957. He received a Bachelor of Science degree from the University of Pennsylvania in 1961 and received his Bachelor of Laws from the University of Pennsylvania Law School in 1964.

Baylson was a law clerk for Joseph Sloane in the Philadelphia Court of Common Pleas in 1965.  He was an assistant district attorney in Philadelphia from 1966 to 1970. From 1970 to 1988 Judge Baylson was in private practice in Philadelphia.

District court service

In 1988 he was appointed by President Ronald Reagan as the United States Attorney for the Eastern District, a position he held until 1993. He returned to private practice as a partner with Duane Morris until 2002, when he was nominated on January 23 by President George W. Bush to a seat on the Eastern District Court that had been vacated by Robert F. Kelly. He was confirmed by the U.S. Senate on April 30, 2002, and received his commission on June 19. He assumed senior status on July 13, 2012.

Other interests

Baylson was a founder, and later counsel, to Gaudenzia, Inc., the largest non-profit provider of drug, alcohol and mental health rehabilitation services in Pennsylvania.

Baylson is a member of the Advisory Committee on Civil Rules of the Committee on Rules of Practice and Procedure of the Judicial Conference of the United States, and is also Adjunct Professor at the University of Pennsylvania Law School and Temple University Beasley School of Law.

References

External links

1939 births
Living people
University of Pennsylvania Law School alumni
Judges of the United States District Court for the Eastern District of Pennsylvania
United States district court judges appointed by George W. Bush
21st-century American judges
United States Attorneys for the Eastern District of Pennsylvania
People from Cheltenham, Pennsylvania
University of Pennsylvania alumni
University of Pennsylvania Law School faculty